Crepidotus affinis is a species of saprophytic fungus in the family Crepidotaceae with a stipeless sessile cap. The fungus was described by Egon Horak in 2018 and has been found in New Zealand, Panama, and the Philippines.

Description
Crepidotus affinis has a similar gross morphology with C. exilis, though it has larger basidiospores and clavate cheilocystidia with a small capitate apex. The cap is fan shaped (flabelliform) with a straight margin. Colour is light brown becoming lighter towards the margin with a fine grained wrinkled (rugulose) surface.

References

Bibliography

Crepidotaceae